Stony Rise is a rural residential locality in the local government area (LGA) of Devonport in the North-west and west LGA region of Tasmania, Australia. The 2021 census recorded a population of 728 for the state suburb of Stony Rise.
It is primarily a residential suburb of Devonport.

There are a few businesses on the along the Bass highway and along Stony Rise Road.

There is a rifle range on Stony Rise Road.

Geography
The Don River forms part of the western boundary. The Western railway line passes through from south-east to north-east.

Road infrastructure 
National Route 1 (Bass Highway) runs through the north-west corner.

References

Suburbs of Devonport, Tasmania
Towns in Tasmania